Primitive World is the debut album by indie rock band Littl'ans.

The album was recorded in July 2007 and mastered at Sterling Sound in New York City.

The album was released in Japan on 2 July 2008 and in the UK on 1 December 2008.

Track listing
"Don't Call It Love"
"Is It Wrong?"
"Everytime"
"Primitive World"
"Did You Hide from Saturday Night?"
"End Dead"
"Chelsea"
"Our Way"
"While on Your Way Back to Me"
"Here Comes the Night"

Japanese Bonus Tracks
"Aftermath"
"Stay Alive"
"Aweful All The Day"

Littl'ans albums
2008 debut albums